This is a list of notable events in country music that took place in the year 1998.

Events 
January 10 — "Retro Country USA," a weekly two-hour syndicated radio program spotlighting major country hits of the 1980s (along with some from the 1970s and early 1990s), premieres. The show is initially hosted by Tampa radio personality Ken Cooper, and later "Big" Steve Kelly.
February 25 — Johnny Cash's album, Unchained, wins a Grammy Award for Best Country Album. The album had been a critical success but was largely ignored by mainstream country radio, a fact Cash and producer Rick Rubin pick up on when they purchase a full-page advertisement in Billboard magazine. The ad, which appeared in March, featured a young Cash displaying his middle finger and sarcastically "thanking" radio for supporting the album.
June 30 — The divorce of Vince and Janis Gill (of Sweethearts of the Rodeo) is finalized.
December — The John F. Kennedy Center for the Performing Arts honors Willie Nelson for his lifetime contributions to the arts. Nelson is the first primarily country performer so honored.

Top hits of the year

Singles released by American artists

Singles released by Canadian artists

Top new album releases

Other top albums

Deaths
January 7 — Owen Bradley, 82, legendary record producer for top artists. (respiratory illness)
January 17 — Cliffie Stone, 80, music executive and bassist.
January 19 — Carl Perkins, 65, top picker and rockabilly artist. (complications from multiple strokes)
January 24 — Justin Tubb, 62, singer-songwriter who fused honky-tonk and rockabilly in the 1950s.
February 19 — Grandpa Jones, 84, banjo player, old-time country/gospel singer, comedian and regular on "Hee Haw" (stroke)
February 25 — Rockin' Sidney Simien, 59, rhythm and blues, Zydeco, and soul musician best known to country audiences for his 1985 hit, "My Toot Toot." (cancer)
April 6 — Tammy Wynette, 55, top country female vocalist of the 1960s and 1970s, best known for hits "D-I-V-O-R-C-E" and "Stand By Your Man." (blood clot)
April 16 — Rose Maddox, 71, female honky-tonk and rockabilly pioneer who fronted the Maddox Brothers and Rose (kidney failure)
May 7 — Eddie Rabbitt, 56, prolific songwriter and pop-country vocalist who once had 35 Top 10 hits in as many releases. (lung cancer)
May 22 – Royce Kendall, 62, sang alongside daughter, Jeannie Kendall, of The Kendalls. (stroke)
June 10 — Steve Sanders, 45, member of the Oak Ridge Boys from 1987 to 1995; replaced and succeeded by William Lee Golden. (suicide)
July 6 — Roy Rogers, 86, actor, singer and "King of the Cowboys." (congestive heart failure)
October 2 — Gene Autry, 91, actor and "The Singing Cowboy" (lymphoma).

Hall of Fame inductees

Bluegrass Music Hall of Fame inductees
Carlton Haney
Chubby Wise

Country Music Hall of Fame inductees
George Morgan (1924–1975)
Elvis Presley (1935–1977)
E.W. “Bud” Wendell (born 1927)
Tammy Wynette (1942–1998)

Canadian Country Music Hall of Fame inductees
Ray Griff
Bill Anderson

Major awards

Grammy Awards
Best Female Country Vocal Performance — "You're Still the One," Shania Twain
Best Male Country Vocal Performance — "If You Ever Have Forever in Mind", Vince Gill
Best Country Performance by a Duo or Group with Vocal — "There's Your Trouble", Dixie Chicks
Best Country Collaboration with Vocals — "Same Old Train", Clint Black, Joe Diffie, Merle Haggard, Emmylou Harris, Alison Krauss, Patty Loveless, Earl Scruggs, Ricky Skaggs, Marty Stuart, Pam Tillis, Randy Travis, Travis Tritt and Dwight Yoakam
Best Country Instrumental Performance — "A Soldier's Joy" Vince Gill and Randy Scruggs
Best Country Song — "You're Still the One", Shania Twain and Robert John "Mutt" Lange
Best Country Album — Wide Open Spaces, Dixie Chicks
Best Bluegrass Album — Bluegrass Rules!, Ricky Skaggs & Kentucky Thunder

Juno Awards
Best Country Male Vocalist — Paul Brandt
Best Country Female Vocalist — Shania Twain
Best Country Group or Duo — Leahy

Academy of Country Music
Entertainer of the Year — Garth Brooks
Song of the Year — "Holes in the Floor of Heaven", Steve Wariner and Billy Kirsch
Single of the Year — "This Kiss", Faith Hill
Album of the Year — Wide Open Spaces, Dixie Chicks
Top Male Vocalist — Tim McGraw
Top Female Vocalist — Faith Hill
Top Vocal Duo or Group — Dixie Chicks
Top New Male Vocalist — Mark Wills
Top New Female Vocalist — Jo Dee Messina
Top New Vocal Duo or Group — Dixie Chicks
Video of the Year — "This Kiss", Faith Hill (Director: Steven Goldmann)
Vocal Event of the Year — "Just To Hear You Say That You Love Me", Faith Hill with Tim McGraw

ARIA Awards 
(presented in Sydney on October 20, 1998)
Best Country Album - My Own Sweet Time (Shanley Del)

Canadian Country Music Association
CMT Maple Leaf Foods Fans' Choice Award — Shania Twain
Male Artist of the Year — Paul Brandt
Female Artist of the Year — Shania Twain
Group or Duo of the Year — Leahy
SOCAN Song of the Year — "Born Again in Dixieland," Jason McCoy, Naoise Sheridan, Denny Carr
Single of the Year — "You're Still the One," Shania Twain
Album of the Year — Come on Over, Shania Twain
Top Selling Album — Come on Over, Shania Twain
Video of the Year — "Don't Be Stupid (You Know I Love You)", Shania Twain
Wrangler Rising Star Award — Bruce Guthro
Vocal Collaboration of the Year — "Your Love", Michelle Wright and Jim Brickman

Country Music Association
Entertainer of the Year — Garth Brooks
Song of the Year — "Holes in the Floor of Heaven", Steve Wariner and Billy Kirsch
Single of the Year — "Holes in the Floor of Heaven", Steve Wariner
Album of the Year — Everywhere, Tim McGraw
Male Vocalist of the Year — George Strait
Female Vocalist of the Year — Trisha Yearwood
Vocal Duo of the Year — Brooks & Dunn
Vocal Group of the Year — Dixie Chicks
Horizon Award — Dixie Chicks
Music Video of the Year — "This Kiss", Faith Hill (Director: Steven Goldmann)
Vocal Event of the Year — "You Don't Seem to Miss Me," Patty Loveless with George Jones
Musician of the Year — Brett Mason

RPM Big Country Awards
Canadian Country Artist of the Year — Shania Twain
Best Country Album — Come On Over, Shania Twain
Best Country Single — "Little Ol' Kisses", Julian Austin
Male Artist of the Year — Paul Brandt
Female Artist of the Year — Terri Clark
Group of the Year — Leahy
Outstanding New Male Artist — Bruce Guthro
Outstanding New Female Artist — Beverley Mahood
Outstanding New Group or Duo — Montana Sky
Canadian Country Video — "Little Ol' Kisses", Julian Austin
Top Country Composer(s) — Julian Austin

See also
Country Music Association
Inductees of the Country Music Hall of Fame

References

Further reading
Whitburn, Joel, "Top Country Songs 1944–2005 – 6th Edition." 2005.

External links
Country Music Hall of Fame

Country
Country music by year